Commission scolaire francophone du Nunavut (CSFN) is the French-language school board in Nunavut, headquartered in Iqaluit. The board operates the École des Trois-Soleils.

References

External links
  Commission scolaire francophone du Nunavut
  École des Trois-Soleils

School districts in Nunavut
Education in Iqaluit